Termes (Languedocien: Tèrme) is a commune in the Aude department in southern France.

Population

See also
 Corbières AOC
 Communes of the Aude department

References

External links

 Official site of the castle and the village, in English

Communes of Aude